Čelopeci may refer to:

Čelopeci, Kičevo, a village in Kičevo Municipality, North Macedonia
, a village in Župa dubrovačka Municipality, Croatia